KNTH (1070 AM) is a conservative talk radio station serving the Houston, Texas metropolitan area. It is owned by Salem Media Group. KNTH's transmitter site is located in Northwest Harris County and its studios are located in Sharpstown district in Southwest Houston. KNTH relays its programming on to an FM relay translator, purchased from Armida Saille, on 103.3 FM from a transmit site near Farm to Market Road 1960 and T.C. Jester Boulevard in Bammel Village. This translator originally operated in Kingsville, Texas before moving to Houston.

The station broadcasts syndicated programming on the weekdays, such as Morning in America (hosted by former Reagan Education Secretary Bill Bennett), The Mike Gallagher Show, Dennis Prager, Michael Medved, Hugh Hewitt, and Bloomberg On The Money.  Weekends feature locally produced programs on a multitude of topics, including gardening with "The Dirt Doctor" Howard Garrett, home improvement with "House Talk Today with Chris Miles", as well as nationally syndicated shows on health, real-estate and other non-political topics. The station also broadcasts Baylor University Football.

History

The Glory Years as "Keener" Country
During the 1970s, 1070 AM KENR Houston, Texas was a country music radio station.
The station first signed on in 1970 as a 5,000-watt daytimer, owned by Bill Edwards of Saginaw, Michigan. In 1971, the station began broadcasting 24 hours a day and increased its power to 10,000 watts daytime and 5,000 watts at night. DJs on "Keener" Country in the early days included Eddie Kilroy, who went on to become a prominent country music record producer in Nashville, and Jacky Ward, who subsequently scored country hits of his own with songs such as "Fools Fall In Love" and "Big Blue Diamond."

When KENR started broadcasting 24 hours in 1971, Leroy J. Gloger, then-owner of KIKK, was concerned about the fate of his station, so he sold it to Sonderling Broadcasting. In the meantime, KNUZ's owner, Dave Morris, who felt his station was losing a Top 40 turf war with KILT and was also being hurt by KULF, so he flipped the station's format to "Country Fresh Kay-News" in 1973. However, according to Houston radio vet Chuck Tiller, KNUZ at its best was a "punch", meaning that if you didn't like what KENR or KIKK were playing, you might "punch" your button for KNUZ as a second choice.

By 1973, KENR was a big success, becoming the first major-market country station to be ranked #1 in all demographic groups 12 years old and older. DJ and music director "Dr. Bruce" Nelson (now known as "Dr. Bruce" Nelson Stratton) had a hand in this and, accordingly, was named Gavin Music Director of the Year in 1974.
Allegedly, the station helped boost the careers of Mickey Gilley, Freddy Fender, Johnny Lee and Gene Watson. Despite one #68 U.S. country chart hit ("Now I Can Live Again") in 1968, Gilley was essentially a local Houston-area artist when, in 1974, he cut a single, "She Called Me Baby", to be distributed in jukeboxes around the adjacent city of Pasadena, Texas. Nelson found the record, flipped it over and played the B-side on the air. The song, "Room Full Of Roses", became a hit, Playboy Records picked it up and it became the first of sixteen #1 country chart hits for Gilley.
Nelson also started, on KENR, the first live broadcast from Gilley's nightclub, the "Saturday Night Special", which evolved into the syndicated "Live at Gilley's" show that was popular during the "Urban Cowboy" craze.

The liner notes of Watson's 1975 album "Love In the Hot Afternoon" includes the statement, "We at Capitol Records owe a debt of gratitude to radio stations KENR, KIKK and KNUS (sic; this should read KNUZ) in Houston for their part in exposing the talents of Gene Watson ..." The album included three country hits, including "You Could Know As Much About A Stranger."

Around 1976-77, KENR's DJ lineup included morning man "Buffalo Bill" Bailey (whose schtick included appearances by Ezra Brooks and other denizens of the Let It Pour Lounge); late-morning DJ Hal McClain (whose schtick included call-in sessions by "Granny"); early-afternoon DJ Dick Martin followed by Bruce Nelson in afternoon drive and DJ Mike Cannon evening drive. (Bailey later became a Harris Co., Texas, constable.)By the way, Mike Cannon went on to become director of communications for The Houston Astros baseball organization and was referred to affectionately on the game broadcasts by legendary announcer, Milo Hamilton, as "Mike, the loose Cannon".

Other DJs during KENR's tenure included Howard Reynolds (1980) and Jim Rose (1981). Additionally, helicopter traffic reporter "Chopper Bill" Waldrop worked there in 1981 as well. Another Jock of note was Sonny Ray Stolz (1977–1981) who was Houston's first FM Country DJ, having signed on KIKK-FM in September 1966 and had a 14-point rating share. Sonny became the voice of Big Tex for The State Fair of Texas after statewide announcer competition in 2001. While at KENR, Sonny Ray Stolz produced 'The Original Home Grown Show' which featured strictly Texas music and Texas artists, a ground-breaking concept which spawned several imitators across the state. However, KENR was the first to provide this forum.

Circa 1979-80, KENR management brought in Joe Formicolla to be the new program director. At times he also filled in on-air. Although his distinct northern accent was a handicap for being on-air in Texas country music, Formicolla did bring the concept of dropping interesting trivia into the course of an air shift, requiring all jocks to do likewise. They actually read items from sources such as The National Enquirer, etc. Formicolla left KENR circa 1981 and later was awarded Country Music DJ of the Year by the Country Music Association and recognized during its annual awards TV program from Nashville.

KENR Goes Gold
In 1981, KILT-FM changed formats to country from album rock in January; longtime top 40 sister KILT followed suit in June. Additionally, nationwide, music on AM was fading at that time. (One exception, albeit an off-topic one, was the success of KKBQ Houston—once known as KULF—for a time starting in mid-1982.)

KENR responded by becoming "Keener Country Gold." But it was being seriously hurt by KIKK-FM and both versions of KILT.

KENR Drops Country; Becomes "The Radio Magazine"
In 1982, the new management of Lake Huron flipped KENR's format again to news/talk as "The Radio Magazine, KENR." Former KNUZ air personality Joe Ford became morning man, Chuck Scott from channel 39 KHTV (now KIAH) did news and former New Yorker Peggy Crone handled entertainment news. John Greer and Mark Seegers did sports. Mike Shiloh was also on the staff as well. The station also carried Houston Astros play-by-play. And Bob Stephenson aired an outdoors show at 4 a.m. Aside from news, talk and sports, the station also programmed pre-rock standards music. Former KNUZ air personality Chuck Tiller was on the afternoon shift 2 p.m.-6 p.m. By November 1982, the station's music changed to light adult contemporary. The call letters were changed to KRBE on January 1, 1983, and became the Radio Magazine KRBE. By spring, Houston Astros ballgames were simulcast on KRBE-FM. The radio magazine ceased in June 1983.

As KRBE
AM 1070 subsequently went through periodic format changes, occasionally simulcasting sister KRBE (which flipped back to top 40 in late 1984) and, at other times, airing such formats as classic rock and hard rock.

Susquehanna Acquires KRBE
In November 1986, Susquehanna Radio purchased KRBE AM & FM. AM 1070, by then, was known for its classic rock format. The format was dropped in January 1987,and returned to a simulcast of KRBE-FM, which lasted until early 1988.

Z Rock Comes to Houston
After breaking simulcast with its FM counterpart this time, KRBE began running the Satellite Music Network, hard rock format "Z-Rock" under the KKZR callsign. Susquehanna changed 1070's call letters back to KRBE on January 1, 1991, and went back to simulcasting the FM when its agreement with SMN ended.

Susquehanna Sells the AM
The station briefly took on the KCRR ("Community Recall Radio") calls when Susquehanna sold time to a religious broadcaster in 1993, but fell through within four months. The KRBE calls and simulcast returned.

In April 1994, the KENR callsign was restored and the station was sold.

Salem Acquires KENR

Salem Communications purchased KENR in the mid-1990s and broadcast brokered ethnic programming for the first few years. In 2000, Salem sold KKHT 106.9 (now KHPT) to Cox broadcasting for $80 million, plus five other Cox radio stations in other cities.

Salem then moved the Christian talk format and call letters from 106.9 to AM 1070, which became "1070 The Word, KKHT".  In 2002, Salem purchased 100.7 FM from Univision and moved the Christian talk format and call letters to 100.7. Thus, it became "100.7 The Word, KKHT", as it currently remains. At the same time, Salem flipped AM 1070 to the Salem news/talk format as "Newstalk 1070 KNTH". Former KNUZ and KILT air personality Chuck Tiller is the morning announcer on KNTH. He also does local news commentary on Bill Bennett's "Morning In America."

Translator

References

External links
FCC History Cards for KNTH
AM 1070 The Answer Official Site

  Radio Daily News archive
  KFTX 97.5 Real Country website - Dr. Bruce Nelson bio page
 Gene Watson's Ireland-based Fan Site
  440 Satisfaction - Where Are They Now?
  Chuck Tiller's website
 FCC decision to revoke license

Talk radio stations in the United States
Conservative talk radio
Radio stations established in 1968
NTH
Salem Media Group properties